"Afternoon Delight" is a 1976 song by Starland Vocal Band.

Afternoon Delight may also refer to:
 "Afternoon Delight", an episode of Arrested Development
 Afternoon Delight, a 2013 film
 Afternoon Delight, a 1979–1983 Canadian television series

See also 
 The Afternoon Delights, a 1980s American vocal quartet